Lethata aromatica is a moth of the family Depressariidae. It is found in Brazil (São Paulo, Paraná, Espirito Santo, Santa Catarina) and Colombia.

The wingspan is about 22 mm. The forewings are brownish ochreous, with some scattered black and fuscous scales, the costa narrowly suffused with dull light rosy. There is a small purplish-fuscous spot on the middle of the costa, where a faint hardly definable fuscous shade runs to one-fourth of the dorsum. The second discal stigma is represented by a slight fuscous mark. The hindwingsare ochreous-grey whitish, the dorsal half suffused with light grey.

References

Moths described in 1915
Lethata